Festuca cinerea, the blue fescue, is a species of perennial grass in the family Poaceae (true grasses). They have a self-supporting growth form and simple, broad leaves. Individuals can grow to 29 cm tall.

Sources

References 

cinerea
Flora of Malta